Infinity Football Club is a football club currently based in Sidlesham, West Sussex. The club compete in Hampshire Premier League Division One having previously competed in the Wessex League

History
Founded in 2006, Infinity joined the Winchester & District League, before joining the Hampshire League 2004 in 2009, finishing runners-up in 2011. Following the Hampshire League 2004 dissolving in 2013, Infinity joined the Hampshire Premier League Division One. In 2015, the club won Division One, gaining promotion to the Senior Division. In 2019, the club finished as runners up in the Senior Division. In 2021, the club was admitted into the Wessex League Division One. On 6 February 2022, Infinity withdrew from the Wessex League, following the termination of their groundsharing agreement with Hythe & Dibden. Ahead of the following season, the club relocated to Sidlesham to play at the local recreation ground and restarted life back in the Hampshire Premier League Division One.

Ground
Upon formation, Infinity played in Winchester, before relocation to Southampton. Infinity later moved to Knowle, before moving to Hythe in 2020 to groundshare with Hythe & Dibden at their Clayfields ground. In 2022, they relocated to Sidlesham.

References

Association football clubs established in 2006
2006 establishments in England
Football clubs in England
Football clubs in Hampshire
Hampshire League 2004
Hampshire Premier League
Wessex Football League